Clupavus is an extinct genus of ray-finned fish that lived during the Cretaceous period.

References 

Ostariophysi
Prehistoric ray-finned fish genera
Late Cretaceous fish of Africa
Early Cretaceous fish of South America
Cretaceous Brazil
Fossils of Brazil
Cretaceous Morocco
Fossils of Morocco
Fossil taxa described in 1950